Gebler is a surname. Notable people with the surname include:

 Friedrich August von Gebler or Fedor Vasilievich Gebler (1781–1850), Prussian-born Russian naturalist
 Gerry J.E. Gebler (1943–2005), Canadian politician

See also
 Geller